The 2003 Barnsley Metropolitan Borough Council election took place on 1 May 2003 to elect members of Barnsley Metropolitan Borough Council in South Yorkshire, England. One third of the council was up for election and the Labour party stayed in overall control of the council.

Election result
Overall turnout in the election was 24%.

This resulted in the following composition of the council:

Ward results

+/- figures represent changes from the last time these wards were contested.

References

2003 English local elections
2003
2000s in South Yorkshire